Civil awards and decorations of the United States are awards and decorations of the United States of America which are bestowed by various agencies of the United States government for acts of accomplishment benefiting the nation as a whole. U.S. civil awards and decorations are typically issued for sustained meritorious service or for eminence in a field of endeavour, though there are also awards and decorations for a specific heroic act.

United States civil awards and decorations are issued by federal, state, and local authorities with the most recognizable decorations issued on the federal level.  Certain other civil decorations may be authorized for wear on U.S. military uniforms, upon approval of the military service departments.  Each of the military branches also maintains their own series of civil decorations separate from military awards.

The following is a listing of articles pertaining to United States civil awards and decorations.

Federal government

 Awards and decorations of the United States government
 Awards and decorations of the United States Merchant Marine

State government

 Awards and decorations of the National Guard
 Awards and decorations of the State Defense Forces

Local government

 United States law enforcement decorations

Other organizations
 Awards and decorations of the Naval Sea Cadet Corps
 Awards and decorations of the Civil Air Patrol
 Cadet awards of the Virginia Tech Corps of Cadets
 Medals and badges of the Boy Scouts of America

See also

 :Category:Military awards and decorations of the United States (including for civilians)